Neeti Mohan is an Indian popular singer. She was one of the winners of the Channel V show Popstars and as such, became a member of the Indian pop group Aasma with the other winners of the show. She was also on the Star Plus show Music Ka Maha Muqqabla, where she was part of the winning team Shankar's Rockstars led by Shankar Mahadevan. She is a regular on A. R. Rahman live shows.

Hindi songs

2009

2010

2012

2013

2014

2015

2016

2017

2018

2019

2020

2021

2022

Other languages

Tamil songs

Telugu songs

Bengali songs

English songs

Marathi songs

Gujarati songs

Kannada songs

Punjabi songs

Malayalam songs

References

{{|date=jan 29 2020 |bot=InternetArchiveBot |fix-attempted=yes }}
Mohan, Neeti